Menegazzia neotropica is a species of lichen from the Neotropics. It was described as new to science in 2002 by Norwegian lichenologist Jarle Bjerke.

See also
List of Menegazzia species

References

neotropica
Lichen species
Lichens described in 2002
Lichens of South America